The meridian 74° east of Greenwich is a line of longitude that extends from the North Pole across the Arctic Ocean, Asia, the Indian Ocean, the Southern Ocean, and Antarctica to the South Pole.

The 74th meridian east forms a great circle with the 106th meridian west.

From Pole to Pole
Starting at the North Pole and heading south to the South Pole, the 74th meridian east passes through:

{| class="wikitable plainrowheaders"
! scope="col" width="115" | Co-ordinates
! scope="col" | Country, territory or sea
! scope="col" | Notes
|-
| style="background:#b0e0e6;" | 
! scope="row" style="background:#b0e0e6;" | Arctic Ocean
| style="background:#b0e0e6;" |
|-
| style="background:#b0e0e6;" | 
! scope="row" style="background:#b0e0e6;" | Kara Sea
| style="background:#b0e0e6;" |
|-
| style="background:#b0e0e6;" | 
! scope="row" style="background:#b0e0e6;" | Gulf of Ob
| style="background:#b0e0e6;" | Passing just west of Shokalsky Island, 
|-
| 
! scope="row" | 
| Gydan Peninsula, Yamalo-Nenets Autonomous Okrug
|-
| style="background:#b0e0e6;" | 
! scope="row" style="background:#b0e0e6;" | Gulf of Ob
| style="background:#b0e0e6;" |
|-
| 
! scope="row" | 
| Gydan Peninsula, Yamalo-Nenets Autonomous Okrug
|-
| style="background:#b0e0e6;" | 
! scope="row" style="background:#b0e0e6;" | Gulf of Ob
| style="background:#b0e0e6;" |
|-
| 
! scope="row" | 
|Yamalo-Nenetsia, Khantia-Mansia, Tyumen Oblast, Omsk Oblast
|-
| 
! scope="row" | 
| Pavlodar Region, Akmola Region, Karaganda Region (passing through Lake Balkhash), Jambyl Region
|-
| 
! scope="row" | 
|Chüy Region, Naryn Region, Osh Region
|-
| 
! scope="row" | 
| Xinjiang
|-
| 
! scope="row" | 
|Kuhiston-Badakhshon
|-
| 
! scope="row" | 
|Badakhshan Province
|-valign="top"
| 
! scope="row" | 
| Gilgit-Baltistan - claimed by  Khyber Pakhtunkhwa Azad Kashmir - claimed by 
|-
| 
! scope="row" | 
|Jammu and Kashmir - claimed by 
|-
| 
! scope="row" | 
| Azad Kashmir - claimed by 
|-
| 
! scope="row" | 
| Jammu and Kashmir - claimed by 
|-valign="top"
| 
! scope="row" | 
| Azad Kashmir - claimed by  Punjab
|-valign="top"
| 
! scope="row" | 
| Punjab Rajasthan Gujarat Maharashtra Gujarat Maharashtra Goa
|-valign="top"
| style="background:#b0e0e6;" | 
! scope="row" style="background:#b0e0e6;" | Indian Ocean
| style="background:#b0e0e6;" | Passing just east of Heard Island, 
|-
| style="background:#b0e0e6;" | 
! scope="row" style="background:#b0e0e6;" | Southern Ocean
| style="background:#b0e0e6;" |
|-valign="top"
| 
! scope="row" | Antarctica
| Australian Antarctic Territory, claimed by 
|-
|}

See also
73rd meridian east
75th meridian east

e074 meridian east